Gilbert White (9 June 1859 – 1 April 1933) was an Anglican bishop who served two Australian dioceses for 25 years.

Early life 
Gilbert White was born on 9 June 1859 at Rondebosch, South Africa, the son of Francis Gilbert White, clergyman, and his wife Lucy (née Gilderdale). He was named after his great-grand-uncle, the naturalist.

White was educated at Fettes College and Oriel College, Oxford.

Religious life 
Ordained in 1883, after a curacy at Helston White emigrated to Australia where he became Rector of Charters Towers and then Herberton, both in Queensland. From 1890 to 1900 he was Archdeacon of North Queensland.  He was raised to the episcopate in 1900 as the inaugural Bishop of Carpentaria. One of his first acts was to establish a small theological college, Bishop's College. In 1915, he translated to head up the new Willochra Diocese in South Australia.

Later life 
White retired in 1925. In the same year, he was the Australian representative at the World Conference of Life and Work, an ecumenical conference held in Stockholm.

References

Further reading

External links

1859 births
People educated at Fettes College
Alumni of Oriel College, Oxford
Anglican archdeacons in Australia
Anglican bishops of Carpentaria
20th-century Anglican bishops in Australia
Anglican bishops of Willochra
1933 deaths